Glowacz or Głowacz is a surname of Polish-language origin. It may refer to:

 Jürgen Glowacz (born 1952), German footballer
 Stefan Glowacz (born 1965), German rock climber

See also
 

Polish-language surnames